The California red-legged frog (Rana draytonii) is a species of frog found in California (USA) and northern Baja California (Mexico). It was formerly considered a subspecies of the northern red-legged frog (Rana aurora). The frog is an IUCN near-threatened species as of 2021, has a NatureServe conservation status of imperiled as of 2015, and is a federally listed threatened species of the United States that is protected by law.

Distribution
The California red-legged frog is found in California and extreme northern Baja California, northwestern Mexico. This species now occurs most commonly along the northern and southern Coast Ranges, and in isolated areas in the foothills of the Sierra Nevada mountains. The current southernmost California populations are on the Santa Rosa Plateau in Riverside County, and within the Upper Las Virgenes Canyon Open Space Preserve in the Simi Hills in eastern Ventura County, near the community of West Hills. In 2015, egg masses from the nearby Simi Hills were introduced to two streams in the Santa Monica Mountains. Juvenile frogs were found living at the locations a year later.

Description

R. draytonii is a moderate to large frog. It is the biggest native frog species in the western United States. The back is a brown, grey, olive, or reddish color, with black flecks and dark, irregular, light-centered blotches, and is coarsely granular. A dark mask with a whitish border occurs above the upper jaw, and black and red or yellow mottling is in the groin. The lower abdomen and the undersides of its hind legs are normally red. The male can be recognized by its large fore limbs, thumbs, and webbing. Only a portion of the toes are webbed, and it uses vocal sacs to grunt during breeding season. The juvenile frog has more pronounced dorsal spotting, and may have yellow, instead of red, markings on the undersides of the hind legs. A characteristic feature of the red-legged frog is its dorsolateral fold, visible on both sides of the frog, extending roughly from the eye to the hip. R. draytonii looks very similar to the northern red-legged frog.

Ecology and behavior
This species has disappeared from an estimated 70% of its range, and is now only found in about 256 streams or drainages in 28 counties of California. However, the species is still common along the coast, and most of their population declines are in the Sierra Nevada and Southern California. The California red-legged frog is an important food source for the endangered San Francisco garter snake in San Mateo County. The California newt is often found with this species due to sharing habitat requirements and the newts eating their eggs. The California red-legged frog primarily eats earthworms, beetles, flies, and other winged insects. There have been instances where the species was viewed preying on juvenile snakes, small mammals such as mice, and other frogs and tadpoles.

Breeding occurs from late December to early April. The male frog's advertisement call is a series of a few small grunts, usually given while swimming around under water. Choruses are weak and easily missed. The adult California red-legged frog is nocturnal, while juvenile frogs are both nocturnal and active during the daytime. The species inhabits dense, shrubby, or emergent riparian vegetation and still or slow-moving perennial and ephemeral water bodies that also serve as breeding sites. This species has been noted to utilize upland habitats as adults near aquatic areas (such as creeks). They often use these zones for basking and searching for prey. They prefer tall plants such as cattails for protection and to lay eggs.

The tadpoles (larvae) of this species may metamorphose into frogs within about 7 months of hatching from the egg, or may overwinter, taking up to 13 months. This is a recent discovery, which may have management implications for the species, particularly when aquatic habitat undergoes modification.

The California red-legged frog exhibits several behaviors when approached by predators. They either stay immobile, quickly leap into vegetation in an upland habitat or a water source nearby, or, rarely, give off an alarm call to indicate danger. They have also been seen demonstrating the unken reflex when caught.

Conservation

This frog is listed as threatened and is protected by federal and California law. One cause of the population decline is habitat loss and destruction, but introduced predatory species, such as American bullfrogs, might also be a factor. Their habitats are in close proximity to roads and trails, indicating traffic, runoff, pollution, and other human interference may be a significant threat to the species. The species has also been found thriving in undisturbed and isolated ponds in comparison. Vegetation diversity and surface coverage on smaller ponds indicate a greater likelihood of the species being present.

2006
After years of litigation initiated by land developers' organizations, specifically the Home Builders Association of Northern California, and scientific back-and-forth, the US Fish and Wildlife Service announced in April 2006 the designation of about 450,000 acres (1800 km2) of critical California habitat for the threatened frog. This protected habitat did not include any land in Calaveras County, the setting of Mark Twain's short story, "The Celebrated Jumping Frog of Calaveras County", which features this species.

2008
On September 17, 2008, the US Fish and Wildlife Service proposed to more than triple the habitat of the California red-legged frog, citing political manipulation by former Deputy Assistant Secretary Julie MacDonald at the United States Department of the Interior. According to the Los Angeles Times, "development and destruction of wetlands have eliminated the frogs from more than 70% of their historic range. MacDonald would have reduced what was left of the frog's range by 82%." San Mateo County and Monterey County seem to have some of the largest healthy populations of these frogs, especially in coastal wetlands.

2010
In March 2010, the US Fish and Wildlife Service announced  of protected land for the species throughout California, which has implications regarding development and use of such land.

2015
A new law designates the California red-legged frog the “state amphibian.” Presently, it is subject to protection under both federal and state laws passed in 1996. Although the designation as official state amphibian does not provide legal protection to the frog as a threatened species, it does highlight the importance that California places on the frog's preservation.

See also
 Red-legged frog
 Estivation
 Ledson Marsh — Annadel State Park, Sonoma County
 Potentilla hickmanii — Hickman's potentilla

References

Further reading
 
 
"A Field Guide to the Reptiles and Amphibians of Coastal Southern California"  — by Robert N. Fisher and Ted J. Case, USGS.

External links

"A Field Guide to the Reptiles and Amphibians of Coastal Southern California" — Rana draytonii — article + images.
U.S. Fish and Wildlife Service: California red-legged frog
 SF-NPS: Rana draytonii (California Red-Legged Frog)  — detailed description and habitats.
Washington Post: "Calif. Frog at Center of Protection Debate"

Rana (genus)
Amphibians of the United States
Amphibians of Mexico
Fauna of the California chaparral and woodlands
Fauna of the Sierra Nevada (United States)
Fauna of the Baja California Peninsula
Amphibians described in 1852
ESA threatened species
Taxa named by Spencer Fullerton Baird
Taxa named by Charles Frédéric Girard
Symbols of California